is a Japanese screenwriter from Osaka Prefecture.

Screenwriting
 series head writer denoted in bold

Television
 Saint Tail (1996)
 Detective Conan (1997)
 Kasumin (2003)
 Di Gi Charat Nyo! (2003-2004)
 Popolocrois (2003-2004)
 Futakoi (2004)
 The Marshmallow Times (2004-2005)
Sgt. Frog (2004-2011): head writer [eps 104-358]
 Ojarumaru (2004-2014)
 Animal Yokochō (2005)
 Himawari! (2006)
 Silk Road Boy Yuto (2006-2007)
 Nodame Cantabile (2007)
Reideen (2007)
 Les Misérables: Shōjo Cosette (2007)
 Kenkō Zenrakei Suieibu Umishō (2007)
 Deltora Quest (2007-2008): head writer [eps 53-65]
 KimiKiss: Pure Rouge (2007-2008)
Neuro: Supernatural Detective (2008) 
World Destruction: Sekai Bokumetsu no Rokunin (2008) 
 Battle Spirits: Shounen Toppa Bashin (2008-2009)
Toradora! (2008-2009) 
Maria†Holic (2009) 
 Umi Monogatari (2009)
 Nodame Cantabile Final (2010)
 Dance in the Vampire Bund (2010)
 Maid Sama! (2010)
 K-On!! (2010)
 Black Butler (2010)
Beelzebub (2011-2012) 
Maria†Holic: Alive (2011) 
 Steins;Gate (2011)
 Nekogami Yaoyorozu (2011)
 Aquarion Evol (2012)
 Busou Shinki (2012)
 Accel World (2012)
 Magi: The Labyrinth of Magic (2012)
 Chōsoku Henkei Gyrozetter (2012)
 Robotics;Notes (2012)
 Rock Lee & His Ninja Pals (2012-2013)
Mangirl! (2013)
 DD Fist of the North Star (2013)
The Devil Is a Part-Timer! (2013-2022)
Free! -Iwatobi Swim Club- (2013)
 Jewelpet Happiness (2013)
 Strike the Blood (2014)
 Riddle Story of Devil (2014)
 Lady Jewelpet (2014)
Free! - Eternal Summer (2014) 
 World Trigger (2014)
Jewelpet: Magical Change (2015)
Mikagura School Suite (2015)
Shimoneta (2015)
 Heavy Object (2015)
Re:Zero − Starting Life in Another World (2016, 2020-2021)
All Out!! (2016-2017)
MARGINAL＃4 (2017)
Sakura Quest (2017)
 Kabukibu! (2017)
 How to Keep a Mummy (2017)
 GeGeGe no Kitarō 6th series (2018)
 Nil Admirari no Tenbin: Teito Genwaku Kitan (2018)
Free! - Dive to the Future (2018) 
Bakumatsu (2018)
Rascal Does Not Dream of Bunny Girl Senpai (2018)
 Bakumatsu: Crisis (2019)
 YU-NO: A Girl Who Chants Love at the Bound of this World (2019)
Wasteful Days of High School Girls (2019)
Iwa-Kakeru! Climbing Girls (2020) 
Yu-Gi-Oh! Sevens (2020)
 Mewkledreamy (2020-2022)
Tropical-Rouge! Pretty Cure (2021-2022)
Aoashi (2022)

Films
 Crossfire (2000)
 Oboreru Sakana (2001)
Godzilla, Mothra and King Ghidorah: Giant Monsters All-Out Attack (2001)
Godzilla: Tokyo S.O.S. (2003)
 Chō Gekijōban Keroro Gunsō 2: Shinkai no Princess de Arimasu! (2007)
 Keroro Gunso the Super Movie 3: Keroro vs. Keroro Great Sky Duel (2008)
 High Speed! Free! Starting Days (2015)
 Free! Take Your Marks (2017)
 Rascal Does Not Dream of a Dreaming Girl (2019)
 Free! The Final Stroke - Part 1 (2021), co-written with Eisaku Kawanami
 Free! The Final Stroke - Part 2 (2022), co-written with Eisaku Kawanami

References

External links

Anime screenwriters
Living people
People from Osaka Prefecture
Year of birth missing (living people)